The Royal Arches refers to a cliff containing natural occurring granite exfoliation arches, located below North Dome and rising above Yosemite Valley, in Yosemite National Park, California..  

The Royal Arches are located on the north side of the valley, northeast of the Ahwahnee Hotel. Adjacent to the Royal Arches is the Royal Arch Cascade waterfall.

Rock climbing
The Royal Arches, like much of the Yosemite area,  feature a great choice of rock climbing sites.  The "Royal Arches" climbing area spans from the Church Bowl to Washington Column. The Royal Arches Route is recognized in the historic climbing text Fifty Classic Climbs of North America.

See also
Landforms of Yosemite National Park

References 

Granite formations
Rock formations of Yosemite National Park
Climbing areas of California
Natural arches of California
Landforms of Mariposa County, California